Burley is a surname. Notable people with the surname include:

Adam Burley, medieval English logician
Aidan Burley, New Zealand-born English politician
Charley Burley, American boxer
Craig Burley, Scottish footballer
Fulton Burley, Irish-Canadian musician known for his work for Disney
George Burley, Scottish footballer and manager
Gillian Beer (born Burley), British literary critic
Ingrid Burley, American rapper and singer
Jane Burley, Scottish field hockey midfielder
Jos Burley, member of New Zealand's women's cricket team
Joseph Leonard Burley, founder of the Burley Football Company
Kay Burley, English television newscaster
Nancy Burley (1930–2013), Australian figure skater
Nick Burley, American boxer
Robert Burley, Canadian photographer
Siaha Burley, American arena football player
Simon de Burley, English knight, court official, and childhood friend of Richard II
W. J. Burley, author of the Wycliffe detective novels
Walter Burley, medieval English logician